The Vatya culture was an archaeological culture of the Early to Middle Bronze Age (ca. 2000-1400 BC) located in the central area of the Danube basin in Hungary. The culture formed from the background of the Nagyrév culture together with influences from the Kisapostag culture. It is characterized mainly by fortified settlements, cremation burial sites, and bronze production. It was succeeded by the Urnfield culture. 

Százhalombatta-Földvár, located by the Danube river in Hungary, was an important fortified Vatya settlement, with occupation layers up to 6 m deep.

Gallery

See also
 Ottomány culture
 Wietenberg culture
 Monteoru culture
 Tumulus culture
 Nordic Bronze Age
 Srubnaya culture

References

Archaeological cultures of Central Europe
Bronze Age cultures of Europe
Archaeological cultures in Hungary